This is an incomplete list of the last surviving veterans of Brazilian wars. The last surviving veteran of any particular war, upon his death, marks the end of a historic era. Exactly who is the last surviving veteran is often an issue of contention, especially with records from long-ago wars. The "last man standing" was often very young at the time of enlistment and in many cases had lied about his age to gain entry into the service, which confuses matters further. There were also sometimes incentives for men to lie about their ages after their military service ended.

18th century

Inconfidência Mineira (1789) 
 Padre Manuel Rodrigues da Costa (1754–1844) – Inconfidentes. Also participated in the Independence of Brazil and in the Liberal Rebellions of 1842.
 José de Resende Costa (1766–1841) – Inconfidentes.

19th century

War of Independence of Brazil (1822-25) 

 Joaquim Marques Lisboa, future Marquis of Tamandaré (1807–1897) – Imperial Brazilian Navy. Volunteer cabin boy on the frigate Niterói. Last known combatant.

Ragamuffin War (1835-45) 
 Manuel Lucas de Oliveira Filho (1795–1874) – Riograndense Republic. Last Ragamuffin Army Brazilian-born commander.
 Giuseppe Garibaldi (1807–1882) – Riograndense Republic. Last Ragamuffin Army commander.
 Anísio Manoel de Souza (1822(9?)–1938) –  Riograndense Republic. Later served in the Paraguayan War. Oldest soldier in Brazilian Army's history.

Paraguayan War (1864-70) 
 Prince Gaston of Orleans, Count of Eu (1842–1922) – Last commander of the Triple Alliance army.
 Manuel do Nascimento Vargas (1844–1943) – Corporal Volunteer of the 28th Provisional Cavalry Corps of the National Guard.. Later served in the Federalist Revolution. Father of president Getúlio Vargas.
 Pedro Hahn (1850–1949) – Brazilian Army. Last German-Brazilian veteran.
 Pedro Guedes do Amaral (1846–1954) – Brazilian Army. Later served in the Federalist Revolution and in the War of Canudos.

War of Canudos (1896-97) 
 José Ciríaco (?–1974) – Canudos inhabitants.
 Honório Vila Nova (1864–1969) – Canudos inhabitants. Later served in the Revolt of Juazeiro.
 Antonio de Isabel (1894?–2005) – Canudos inhabitants. Child or baby who lived in Canudos, being the last survivor.

20th century

Revolt of the Lash (1910) 
 João Cândido Felisberto (1880-1969) – Leader and last known rebel. Also served in the Federalist Revolution.

Contestado War (1912-16) 
 Firmino Rodrigues Martim (1894–c.2000) – Brazilian Army (vaqueanos).
 Sebastiana da Silva Medeiros (1908–2013) – Child survivor of the crimes of beheading.
Altino Bueno da Silva (1903?–2014) – Last rebellious child and witness of the slaughter.

World War I (1914-18) 
 José Pessoa Cavalcanti de Albuquerque (1885–1959) – Brazilian Army. Last officer.
 Waldemar Levy Cardoso (1900–2009) – Brazilian Army. Also participated in the Paulista Revolt of 1924, the Brazilian Revolution of 1930, the Constitutionalist Revolution of 1932, the World War II and the 1964 Brazilian coup d'état. Last Brazilian Field Marshal.

18 of the Copacabana Fort revolt (1922) 
 Altino Gomes da Silva (1904–1996) – Tenentistas.

Paulista Revolt of 1924 
 Eduardo Gomes (1896–1981) – Tenentistas. Last of the lieutenant leaders. Also a veteran of the Constitutionalist Revolution of 1932.
 Waldemar Levy Cardoso (1900–2009) – Tenentistas. Also a veteran of the World War I, the Brazilian Revolution of 1930, the Constitutionalist Revolution of 1932, the World War II and the 1964 Brazilian coup d'état. Last Brazilian Field Marshal.
 Hercules Caetano Castagna (1919–2019?) – Last witness of Mooca.

Brazilian Revolution of 1930 
 Olimpio Martins Pires (1908?–2020) – New State. Served as an MP in Minas Gerais. Also participated in the Revolution of 1932.

Constitutionalist Revolution (1932) 
 Brasílio Taborda (1877–1973) – São Paulo. Last commander of the Constitutionalist Army.
 Ivo Borges (1890–1980) – São Paulo. Last commander of the Constitutionalist Air Force.
 Eduardo Gomes (1896–1981) – Brazil. Air major at the time. Last commander of the Federal Force.
 José Luiz Silveira (1909–c. 2011) – Brazil. Served in the BMRS. Last Battle of Cerro Alegre combattant. Also participated in the Revolution of 1923 and in the Revolution of 1930.
 Osvaldo Rafael Santiago (1915–2013) – São Paulo. Last Itapetininga rebel combattant.
 Natalino Antonio Augusto (1910–2014) – São Paulo. Last Campinas rebel combattant.
 José Mango (1913–2015) – São Paulo. Last rebel veteran of the Battle of Gravi.
 Zuleika Sucupira Kenworthy (1912–2017) – São Paulo. Last Jundiaí rebel combattant.
 Irany Paraná do Brasil (1913–2017) – São Paulo. Last male São Paulo rebel combattant. Author "1932 - A Guerra de São Paulo".
 Agenor Silva Lima (1912–c. 2018) – São Paulo. Last Ipiranga rebel combattant.
 Arlindo Leonardo Ribeiro (1913–2019) – São Paulo. Last Barretos rebel combattant and last male combattant.
 Maria de Lourdes Pinto Picarelli (1913–2019) – São Paulo. Last rebel combattant.
 Olimpio Martins Pires (1908–2020) – Brazil. Served in the PMMG. Also participated in the Revolution of 1930.
 Alfredo Pires Filho (1920–2021) – São Paulo. Last rebel Boy Scout messenger. Later trained the Brazilian pilots during the World War II.

Communist uprising of 1935 
 Antero de Almeida (1906–2014) – National Liberation Alliance.

World War II (1939-45) 
 Oswaldo Cordeiro de Farias (1901–1981) – Brazilian Expeditionary Force Divisional Artillery Commander. Last FEB commander and general.
 José Albino (1916–1989) – Brazilian Army. Soldier of the 5th Battalion of Hunters. Coastal Surveillance and Defense in Santos.
 Nero Moura (1910–1994) – 1st Brazilian Fighter Squadron General Commander. Last commander of the air forces in war.
 Pierre Henri Clostermann (1921–2006) – Royal Air Force. French-Brazilian. Only Brazilian-born to participate in D-Day.
 José Carlos de Miranda Corrêa (1920–2013) – Brazilian Air Force. Last Brazilian Air Force pilot.
 John William Buyers (1920–2016) – Brazilian Air Force. Last Brazilian Air Force combattant.
 Adolfo José Klock (1922–2018) – Brazilian Expeditionary Force. Last Blumenau combattant.
 Geraldo Perdigão (1922–2020) – Brazilian Expeditionary Force. Last member of the 1st Esquadrilha de Ligação e Observação (Liaison and Observation Squadron; mixed Army and Air Force unit).
 Justino Alfredo (1920–2021) – Brazilian Expeditionary Force. Last Campinas combattant.
 Sebastião Paulino de Lima (1919–2022) – Brazilian Expeditionary Force. Taurepang indigenous. Last veteran of the state of Roraima.
 Bráulio dos Santos Pinto (1923–2022) – Brazilian Expeditionary Force. Last veteran of the state of Paraíba.
 João Caetano da Silva (1924 –2022) – Brazilian Expeditionary Force. Last veteran of the state of Rondônia.
 Carlos Henrique Bessa (1920–2022) – Brazilian Expeditionary Force. 2nd Lieutenant Physician. Last FEB doctor.
 Anselmo Alves (1922–2022) – Brazilian Expeditionary Force. Last veteran in the state of Maranhão.
 Andor Stern (1928–2022) – Holocaust survivor. Only Brazilian-born Holocaust survivor.
 Orlando Pires (1919–2022) – Brazilian Expeditionary Force. Last Araraquara combattant.
 Victorio Nalesso (1922–2022) – Brazilian Expeditionary Force. 11th Infantry Regiment (Tiradentes). Penultimate Itapetininga combattant.
 Argemiro de Toledo Filho (1925–2022) – Brazilian Expeditionary Force. 1st Infantry Regiment (Sampaio). Last Itapetininga combattant.
 Joatan Conegundes de Araújo (1922–2023) – Brazilian Expeditionary Force. Last veteran in the state of Acre.
 Manuel Alves de Oliveira (1923–2023) – Brazilian Expeditionary Force. Last FEB stretcher bearer.
 Nestor da Silva (1917–living) – Brazilian Expeditionary Force. Last veteran residing in the Federal District.
 Virgínia Maria de Niemeyer Portocarrero (1917–living) – Brazilian Expeditionary Force. Last FEB nurse.
 Justino Pires de Arruda (1919–living) – Brazilian Expeditionary Force. Last veteran in the state of Mato Grosso do Sul.
 Hugo Pedro Felisbino (1919–living) – Brazilian Expeditionary Force. Last FEB male nurse.
 Mário Expedito Neves Guerreiro (1920–living) – Brazilian Expeditionary Force. Last veteran in the state of Amazonas.
 João Carlos de Lima (1922–living) – Brazilian Expeditionary Force. Last veteran in the state of Rio Grande do Norte.
 Walter Carlos Hertel (1922–living) – Brazilian Expeditionary Force. Last FEB messenger.

See also
 Military history of Brazil
 List of last surviving veterans of military insurgencies and wars
 List of last surviving veterans of military operations
 Last European veterans by war
 Last surviving United States war veterans
 List of last surviving Canadian war veterans

References 

Brazil